Kholmsk, known until 1946 as Maoka, is a port town and the administrative center of Kholmsky District of Sakhalin Oblast, Russia. Population:

History
It was founded in 1870 as a military post. After the Russo-Japanese War of 1904-1905, it was transferred to Japanese control, along with the rest of southern Sakhalin, under the Treaty of Portsmouth. The Japanese renamed it Maoka, it is said to mean "quiet place" in Ainu language.

On August 20, 1945, a combined marine battalion and the 113th infantry brigade landed in Port Maoka. They were preceded by a group of scouts, landed secretively by submarine Sh-118, in the Maoka area to successfully complete their task. However, Japanese resistance was desperate, and the landing party had to fight particularly fiercely. Japanese fire set one of the coastguard vessels on fire, to which the Russian response was intense naval bombardment of the town, causing more civilian deaths. See Soviet assault on Maoka for details.

The Red Army retook the whole of Sakhalin at the end of World War II, with the town receiving its present name in 1946. The name is derived from the Russian word Kholm for hill, referring to the town's location on the hillside surrounding the harbor.

As with a number of urban areas in the Russian Far East, Kholmsk has seen a large drop in population since the dissolution of the Soviet Union and the economic crisis which followed in the 1990s.

Administrative and municipal status
Within the framework of administrative divisions, Kholmsk serves as the administrative center of Kholmsky District and is subordinated to it. As a municipal division, the town of Kholmsk and twenty-three rural localities of Kholmsky District are incorporated as Kholmsky Urban Okrug.

Economy and transport
Kholmsk is an important seaport for Sakhalin Island. Since 1973, it has been the Sakhalin terminal of a Vanino-Kholmsk train ferry to the port of Vanino on the Russian mainland, connecting the mainline rail network with that of the island.

It's the largest transport center on Sakhalin, which includes a non-freezing seaport with 2 terminals, 3 railway stations and a knot of highways. Kholmsk is connected with Vanino port by the Kholmsk—Vanino sea railway passenger-and-freight ferry. From the town, the federal highway R495 Kholmsk—Yuzhno-Sakhalinsk begins. Kholmsk is a large economic, industrial and cultural center of the Sakhalin Oblast, a center of sea fishery and ship repair.

Twin towns and sister cities

Kholmsk is twinned with:
 Ansan, South Korea
 Otaru, Japan
 Kushiro, Japan (since 1975)

References

Notes

Sources

External links

Official website of Kholmsk 
Kholmsk Business Directory 

Cities and towns in Sakhalin Oblast